Brimoncourt is a champagne producer founded in Aÿ in Marne, France, in 2008.

History
The company was founded by Alexandre Cornot and has agreements with grape producers. It is based in Aÿ, the centre of the Champagne region, where it occupies  of space in 18th- and 19th-century buildings and gardens, in part constructed by the Eiffel company and classified as part of the industrial heritage of the region.

Cuvées
Brimoncourt produces three cuvées for sale:

 Brut Régence
 Brut Rosé
 Blanc de Blancs

References
 Le Bouchon
 Les Echos
 Bon Vivant
 L'Union
 Lost in Wine
 Made in Champagne
 La RVI

External links
 

Brimoncourt